Ashley Maitland Welkos (born February 3, 1977), known professionally as Maitland Ward, is an American actress and model. She made her acting debut as Jessica Forrester on the CBS soap opera The Bold and the Beautiful (1994–1996). Continuing to appear in film and television through the mid-2000s, she came to further prominence for playing Rachel McGuire on the sixth and seventh seasons of the ABC sitcom Boy Meets World (1998–2000). After retiring from mainstream acting in 2007, Ward began performing in pornographic films in 2019.

Career

Acting career 
Ward starred as Jessica Forrester on The Bold and the Beautiful, where she appeared from 1994 to 1996. She landed that role, which was her first acting role, when she was 16 and still a junior in high school. Ward had guest-starring roles on USA High and the seventh season of ABC's Home Improvement; and co-starred with Jay Thomas and Mario Lopez in the 1997 television film Killing Mr. Griffin.

Her character of Rachel McGuire was added to Boy Meets World in 1998, at the beginning of the sixth season, as a main cast member. This role lasted until the series ended in 2000. After Ward's stint on Boy Meets World, she appeared in the independent film Dish Dogs, a romantic comedy in which she co-stars with Brian Dennehy, Matthew Lillard and Sean Astin. Later, she appeared in the 2004 comedy film White Chicks with Shawn and Marlon Wayans.

Cosplay and social media 
After retiring from mainstream acting, Ward began engaging in cosplay and making appearances at various comics conventions. Her first cosplay was a slave Princess Leia outfit;  she was given the idea by photographers that she had worked with on the red carpet. She also appeared as Jessica 6 from Logan's Run and as Red Sonja. In recent years, she has also made comics-convention appearances wearing only body paint.

Adult film career 
Beginning in mid-2013, Ward began posting nude and topless photographs of herself on Snapchat and Instagram, gaining a large following on both sites. In April 2016, she posted her first nude pictures to social media of her being body-painted for Luciano Paesani for a Los Angeles exhibition called "Living Art". In 2019, she announced on Instagram that she would be performing in an adult film entitled Drive, a move described by In Touch Weekly as a "drastic career-shift". Ward received support from former Boy Meets World co-star Trina McGee.

In May 2019, Ward signed with adult talent agency Society 15. She stated that she had been approached by adult actress and director Kayden Kross and was "just floored" by the proposition of doing adult films. She told In Touch Weekly, "It's been an evolution. It's all been my authentic journey because everything that I have done along the way is something I wanted to explore and do. I just did it publicly for my fans, that is the exhibitionist style of me." Drive was released online at the website Deeper.com on September 30, 2019.

Of her decision, Ward stated that she feared being typecast and believed that if she became a porn star, new fans would have an opportunity to discover her. Upon Drives release, Ward promised "more taboo stuff to come", and she subsequently appeared in multiple additional porn scenes released on Deeper.com. She has said that she did not believe in any stigma related to being a porn star. Conversely, she claimed that she regards her transition into adult films as a savvy business move.

Personal life
A "Long Beach, California, native" according to Life & Style, Ward married real estate agent Terry Baxter on October 21, 2006. The couple met on a set, and she credits their friendship and humor for the success of their relationship.
After getting married, Baxter and Ward moved to New York, where they still live. While they were there, Ward studied writing and screenwriting at New York University.

Filmography
Mainstream filmography

Adult films

Awards and nominations
 Soap Opera Digest Awards 1995: Nominated, Outstanding Female Newcomer – The Bold and the Beautiful
 Young Artist Awards 1995: Won, Best Performance by a Youth Actress in a Daytime Series – The Bold and the Beautiful
 1996: Nominated, Best Performance by a Youth Actress in a Daytime Series – The Bold and the Beautiful
 AVN Awards 2020: Won, Best Supporting Actress – Drive
 2020: Won, Best Three-Way Sex Scene (G/G/B) – Drive
 2020: Won, Fan Award - Favorite Camming Cosplayer
 2021: Won, Best Actress – Muse
 2021: Won, Best Boy/Girl Sex Scene – Higher Power
 2023: Won, Best Leading Actress – Drift
 2023: Won, Mainstream Venture of the Year
 XBIZ Awards 2020: Won, Crossover Star of the Year
 2020: Won, Best Actress - Feature Movie – Drive
 2020: Won, Best Sex Scene - Feature Movie – Drive
 2020: Nominated, Best New Starlet
 2021: Won, Best Acting - Lead – Muse
 2021: Won, Best Sex Scene - Feature Movie – Muse
 2022: Won, Performer of the Year
 2022: Won, Best Acting - Lead – Muse 2
 2023: Won, Best Sex Scene - Feature Movie – Drift
 NightMoves Awards 2020: Won, Best Actress (Editor's Choice)
 XRCO Awards'''
 2021: Won, Best Actress – Muse 2022: Won, Best Actress – Muse 2 XCritic Awards
 2021: Won, Best Actress – Muse 2022: Won, Best Actress – Muse 2''

References

External links

 
 
 

20th-century American actresses
21st-century American actresses
Actresses from Long Beach, California
American child actresses
American film actresses
American soap opera actresses
American television actresses
Living people
American pornographic film actresses
1977 births
New York University alumni